Emmanuel Addow-Obeng is a Ghanaian academic, administrator and cleric. He was the vice chancellor of the University of Cape Coast and served as the pro vice chancellor of the Central University of Ghana. He is currently the President of President of the Presbyterian University College

Educational and working life
Addow-Obeng obtained a Doctor of Philosophy degree from the University of Aberdeen in 1981. He returned to the University of Cape Coast to take up an appointment as a senior lecturer. After just a year at the university he moved to the University of Ilorin, Nigeria where he lectured till 1990. He moved to the Moi University, Eldoret, Kenya  that same year and was promoted to full professorship in New Testament Studies and Theology in 1996. After years working outside Ghana, he returned in 1997 to the University of Cape Coast to head the Department of Religion. He was appointed the vice chancellor of the University of Cape Coast in 2001. He had a sabbatical at the Central University from 2008 to 2010. 
The release said Prof Addow-Obeng had also taught at Central University College, Miotso, Ghana, where he had spent his sabbatical in 2008–2010. In 1997, he returned from Kenya to teach at the University of Cape Coast. He has thirty-three (33) years experience at the university level and is an ordained minister of the Presbyterian Church of Ghana. He is married with two sons.

Publications
Addow-Obeng has published several books and articles in several national and international journals as well as served on several National and International Boards and committee. He has also authored chapters in books as well as edited books.

Awards 

 Bruce and Fraser Award of the University of Aberdeen 
 Order of Volta of the Republic of Ghana
 Honorary degree of Doctor of Letters, University of Cape Coast
 Doctors Honoris from the University of Aberdeen (UK)

References

Living people
Ghanaian Presbyterians
Vice-Chancellors of universities in Ghana
Academic staff of the University of Cape Coast
Academic staff of Moi University
Alumni of the University of Aberdeen
Ghanaian clergy
Academic staff of the University of Ilorin
Academic staff of Central University, Ghana
Year of birth missing (living people)
Vice-Chancellors of the University of Cape Coast